The Military ranks of Nicaragua are the military insignia used by the Nicaraguan Armed Forces.

Current ranks

Commissioned officer ranks
The rank insignia of commissioned officers.

Other ranks
The rank insignia of non-commissioned officers and enlisted personnel.

Historic ranks

The Nicaraguan National Guard rank chart was directly inspired by the US Army, with chevrons pointed upwards for NCOs, horizontal linked brass bars for company officers and vertically placed gilded or silvered stars for field officers. The sequence however was slightly different, with Sergeants' ranks being limited to two only; Captains were identified by three bars instead of two as per in the US Armed Services, whilst Majors had a five-point gilded star in lieu of a leaf.  National Guard rank insignia from Subteniente to Coronel resembled a US antecedent—but that of the Confederate States Army. There were also some differences in colour and nomenclature according to the branches of service: Ground Forces' NCOs had yellow on dark-green chevrons, the Air Force personnel wore white on royal blue ground forces' rank insignia whilst the Navy's Seamen and Petty Officers' ranks were identical to the other branches of the Guardia, but Line Officers had US Navy-style rank insignia on removable navy blue shoulder boards instead.

Guardia ranks (Ground Forces and National Police)

Air Force ranks

Navy ranks
 – Seaman (no insignia)
 – Able seaman (one pointed chevron)
 – Seaman 1st class (two pointed chevrons)
 – Petty officer, 2nd class (three pointed chevrons)
 – Chief petty officer (three pointed chevrons above one arc)
 – Ensign (one five-pointed star above one narrow bar)
 – Lieutenant junior grade (one five-pointed star above one bar)
 – Senior lieutenant (one five-pointed star above one narrow and one wider bars)
 – Lieutenant (one five-pointed star above two bars)
 – Lieutenant commander (one five-pointed star above one narrow between two wider bars)
 – Commander (one five-pointed star above three bars)
 – Captain (one five-pointed star above four bars)
 – Commodore (one five-pointed star above one very wide bar)

References

External links

 
 

Nicaragua
Military of Nicaragua